The 1999 Men's EuroFloorball Cup Qualifying rounds took place over 11 Novemberth to 13 Novemberth, 1999 in Prague, Czech Republic. The top 2 teams advanced to the 1999 Men's EuroFloorball Cup Finals where they had a chance to win the EuroFloorball Cup for 1999.

The tournament was known as the 1999 Men's European Cup, but due to name implications, is now known as the 1999 Men's EuroFloorball Cup.

Results

See also
1999 Men's EuroFloorball Cup Finals

External links
Standings & Statistics

EuroFloorball Cup
Mens Eurofloorball Cup Qualifying, 1999